The University of Saint Anthony (USANT) is a private, non-sectarian and non-profit educational institution in the Philippines. It was founded in 1947 by Dr. Santiago G. Ortega. USANT is located at Iriga City, Camarines Sur province, Philippines. Originally known as the St. Anthony Academy, it was elevated to the status of university in 1973. The school now also has two campuses located in Indonesia.

Degree programs offered 
 B.S. Nursing/ Midwifery
 B.S. Marine Transportation
 B.S. Marine Engineering
 B.S. Business Administration
 B.S. Office Administration
 B.S. Hospitality Management
 B.S. Tourism Management
 B.S. Computer Science
 B.S. Accountancy
 B.S. Civil Engineering
 B.S. Architecture
 B.S. Technology
 Bachelor of Secondary Education
 Bachelor of Elementary Education
 B.S. Criminology
 B.A. Psychology
 B.A. Communication Arts
 B.A. Political Science
 B.A. English Language
 Bachelor of Library Information Science

Secondary and elementary school 
 Junior and Senior High School
 Night High School class
 Montessori Grade School

Graduate school 
 Doctor of Philosophy in Education
 Master of Arts in Education
 Master of Arts in Nursing
 Masters in Business Administration
 Masters in Police Administration

Notable Alumni

1. Luis G. Dato - Lawyer, writer and poet

References

External links 

 Official website

Universities and colleges in Camarines Sur
Catholic universities and colleges in the Philippines
Iriga